Roscoe is a novel by William Kennedy. Published in 2002, Roscoe depicts an aging politician who is a key behind-the-scenes player in Albany, New York's Democratic Party machine. Although many names have been changed and events added, the book is based on the O'Connell Machine that controlled Albany for decades. Some occurrences in the novel are based on actual events. Many of Kennedy's older relatives were minor figures in the machine.

As of 2013, the novel was being adapted as an opera by composer Evan Mack.

References

2002 American novels
American political novels
Democratic Party (United States)
Novels adapted into operas
Novels by William Kennedy
Novels set in Albany, New York
PEN/Faulkner Award for Fiction-winning works
Viking Press books